Reto Zinsli (born 12 January 1952) is a Swiss judoka. He competed in the men's half-middleweight event at the 1972 Summer Olympics.

References

1952 births
Living people
Swiss male judoka
Olympic judoka of Switzerland
Judoka at the 1972 Summer Olympics
Place of birth missing (living people)